Rickers may refer to:-

Jamie Rickers, British television presenter
Paul Rickers, English soccer player
Ricker's, convenience store chain, based in Indiana (United States), presently owned by GetGo